Joseph Ragusa is a retired American soccer player who played professionally in the USL First Division.
In 1998, Ragusa signed with the Long Island Rough Riders of the USL First Division.  In February 2000, the San Jose Earthquakes selected Ragusa in the second rough (18th overall) of the 2000 MLS SuperDraft.  The Earthquakes released him in the pre-season and he returned to the Rough Riders.  Ragusa left Long Island following the 2001 season, but returned in 2004.  In July 2004, the Roughriders released him.

References

Living people
1976 births
American soccer players
Long Island Rough Riders players
A-League (1995–2004) players
USL Second Division players
San Jose Earthquakes draft picks
People from Copiague, New York
Association football defenders
Association football midfielders